Dale Bryan Murphy (born March 12, 1956) is an American former professional baseball player. His entire MLB career was spent in the National League (NL), during which time he won consecutive Most Valuable Player (MVP) awards (–), the Silver Slugger Award for four straight years (1982–), and the Gold Glove Award for five straight years (1982–). Murphy is a member of the Oregon Sports Hall of Fame, Georgia Sports Hall of Fame, and World Sports Humanitarian Hall of Fame.

Early life
Dale Murphy was born in Portland, Oregon, on March 12, 1956 to parents Charles and Betty. He had a sister, Sue. Murphy played American Legion Baseball and attended Woodrow Wilson High School.

Baseball

Playing career
In 1976, Murphy began his major league career with a nineteen-game stint catching with the Atlanta Braves. He appeared in only eighteen games the following season. In 1978, Murphy played first base mostly; at the plate he had a .226 batting average, though he also showed hints of his future power by hitting 23 home runs.

Murphy switched to the outfield in 1980, a move that would help initiate a decade of highly productive play in the National League. Beginning in left field, he soon switched to center field, the position at which he would find his greatest success. By 1982, the most decorated year of Murphy's career, the former catcher had transformed himself into an All-Star MVP outfielder who appeared in each of Atlanta's 162 games. His turnaround as a fielder was equally stark. In 1978, Murphy led all National League first basemen in errors. In 1982, spending time at each of the three outfield positions, he won the first of five consecutive Gold Gloves, as well as the first MVP award by a Brave since 1957, when Hank Aaron won the award with the then-Milwaukee Braves.

Playing in the decade before the Braves began their dominance of the National League East, Murphy also made his only postseason appearance in 1982. Although he performed well, the eventual World Series-champion St. Louis Cardinals eliminated the Braves in the 1982 National League Championship Series. The league's most valuable player failed to translate his regular season preeminence into October success, hitting safely only three times and scoring one run. Murphy rebounded from the postseason sweep with another MVP award in 1983. This time period ultimately proved the high-water era of Murphy's career. Each year during the four season span from 1982 to 1986 he won a Gold Glove, appeared in the All-Star Game, and placed in the top ten in MVP voting.

In 1988, however, despite being voted to what would be his final All-Star appearance, Murphy's production began an inexorable slide downward. Murphy saw his batting average free-fall from .295 in 1987 to .226 in 1988. Only once more, in 1991, would Murphy bat above .250. Once a consistent source of power at the plate, he never again hit 25 home runs or more in a season.

During his 15th season with the Braves, Murphy was traded to the Philadelphia Phillies on August 3, 1990. Murphy's time with the Phillies was mostly uneventful. A degenerative, arthritic condition in his left knee limited Murphy to only 18 games in the 1992 season with the Phillies, although he did hit two home runs in that time to bring his career total to 398. He was released by the Phillies at the end of 1993 Spring Training and, on the same day, signed a Minor League contract with the Colorado Rockies for their inaugural season. He was used mostly as a pinch hitter.

After going 0-for-3 with a strikeout in the Rockies' 8-0 road loss to the Los Angeles Dodgers on May 21, 1993 (a rare start and, even more rare, only the fourth time all season he was in a game from the first pitch to the final out), Murphy did not play in the next 4 games. On the morning of May 27, 1993, while the Rockies were in Houston to begin a series with the Astros, he suddenly announced his retirement from baseball at age 37. He explained the Rockies were needing to make a 25-man roster move and informed him ahead of time he was going to be released. The team gave him the chance to retire instead of being released, which he did.

Murphy finished at 398 career home runs, failing to homer for the Rockies in 49 plate appearances and reach the 400-homer milestone. At the time of his retirement, he was 27th on the all-time home run list and 4th among active players, two behind Andre Dawson of the Boston Red Sox.

Career summary and honors

Murphy finished his career with 398 home runs, 1,266 RBI, and a .265 lifetime batting average. His MVP awards in 1982 and 1983 make him one of only four outfielders in MLB history with consecutive MVP years; at the time, he was the youngest to have accomplished the feat. His many honors include seven All-Star appearances, five Gold Gloves, and four Silver Sluggers. Murphy led the National League in home runs and runs batted in (RBI) twice; he also led the major leagues in home runs and RBI over the 10-year span from 1981 to 1990.

During the 1980s, Murphy led the National League in games, at bats, runs, hits, extra base hits, RBIs, runs created, total bases, and plate appearances. His 308 home runs during the decade is second only to Mike Schmidt's 313. He also accomplished a 30–30 (30 home runs with 30 stolen bases) season in 1983. Murphy played in 740 consecutive games, at the time the 11th longest such streak in baseball history. His jersey number ("3") was retired by the Atlanta Braves on June 13, 1994, in his honor as opposed to that of even Babe Ruth, who wore Boston Braves number 3 during the partial season with which his career concluded. Murphy was inducted into both the Oregon Sports Hall of Fame and the Georgia Sports Hall of Fame in 1997.

Public persona
Murphy's clean-living habits off the diamond were frequently noted in the media. A devout member of the Church of Jesus Christ of Latter-day Saints (LDS Church), Murphy did not drink alcoholic beverages, would not allow women to be photographed embracing him, and paid his teammates' dinner checks as long as alcoholic beverages were not on the tab. He also refused to give television interviews unless he was fully dressed. Murphy had been introduced to the LDS Church early in his career by teammate Barry Bonnell.

For several years the Atlanta Constitution ran a weekly column, wherein Murphy responded to young fans' questions and letters. In 1987 he shared Sports Illustrated magazine's "Sportsmen and Sportswomen of the Year" award with seven others, characterized as "Athletes Who Care", for his work with numerous charities, including the Make-a-Wish Foundation, the Georgia March of Dimes and the American Heart Association.

One of his more memorable incidents was reminiscent of a scene from the classic black-and-white baseball film The Pride of the Yankees:

Before a home game against San Francisco on June 12, 1983, Murphy visited in the stands with Elizabeth Smith, a six-year-old girl who had lost both hands and a leg when she stepped on a live power line. After Murphy gave her a cap and a T shirt, her nurse innocently asked if he could hit a home run for Elizabeth. "I didn't know what to say, so I just sort of mumbled 'Well, O.K.,' " says Murphy. That day he hit two homers and drove in all the Braves' runs in a 3–2 victory.

He was ultimately granted several honors because of his integrity, character, and sportsmanship, including the Lou Gehrig Memorial Award (1985), "Sportsman of the Year" (1987), Roberto Clemente Award (1988), Bart Giamatti Community Service Award (1991), and World Sports Humanitarian Hall of Fame (1991 induction).

Hall of Fame candidacy
Despite his reputation as a star five-tool player superstar and multiple MVP awards, Murphy has not been elected to the Baseball Hall of Fame. He first appeared on the writers' ballot in 1999. He has failed to gain election, joining Barry Bonds, Roger Maris, and Juan González as the only Hall of Fame-eligible recipients of multiple MVP awards not in the Hall. His failed candidacy has drawn particular notice due to his reputation as a clean-living player whose career was immediately followed by baseball's scandal-plagued "steroids era".

Baseball writer Rob Neyer feels that the former MVP's candidacy has been hurt by a career that "got a late start and suffered an early end." Stuart Miller, baseball writer for The New York Times, also notes the "sharp decline" in production that plagued Murphy after the age of 31 in arguing, "Players who were great for a short time do not receive much [Hall of Fame] recognition." Finding "one of baseball's best players in the 1980s" to be "undervalued", Miller nonetheless writes that the Brave great "is typically considered a 'close but no' guy." Statistician Bill James says of Murphy, "It certainly wouldn't offend me to have him in the Hall of Fame. I just wouldn't advocate it." James set a metric for Hall induction as 300 Win Shares, a statistic weighing what players contribute to their team's victories. Murphy has 253 Win Shares. James ranks eight Hall of Famers below Murphy.

A writer for the Charlotte Observer wrote, "Murphy's incredible nine-year run in Atlanta was every bit as good as anyone else during his era". Neyer notes that the explosion of power during the steroids-fueled era that began after Murphy's retirement may have caused Murphy's numbers to pale in comparison for many voters. Some have argued that Murphy's reputation for clean living may encourage voters to "look more favorably on what Murphy did without using performance-enhancing drugs." (Murphy has asserted that Barry Bonds "without a doubt" used performance-enhancing drugs.) Sports Illustrated'''s Joe Posnanski has endorsed Murphy as an "emotional pick … a larger-than-life character who signed every autograph, spoke up for every charity and played brilliant baseball every day for mostly doomed teams." The Baseball Project, a supergroup composed of Peter Buck, Mike Mills, Scott McCaughey, Steve Wynn and Linda Pitmon, wrote the song “To The Veterans Committee” advocating his election and praising him for meeting the voting criteria: ability, integrity, sportsmanship, character, and contributions to the team(s) on which the player played.

Although he continued to earn the requisite 5% to remain on the ballot, Murphy averaged only 13.6% over the first twelve years of voting.  (Election to the hall requires 75%.) In the first decade of his eligibility, he "peaked at 23% in 2000 and fell to 11.5% in 2009." Moreover, as writers may only vote for ten players each year, some have argued that the candidacy of stars from the 1980s, such as Murphy, will become imperiled as a wave of more recently retired players with more statistically impressive credentials becomes eligible in the 2010s. Noting his low vote totals, Murphy has said, "Since I'm not that close [to election] … I don't think about it that much." On January 9, 2013, in his 15th and final appearance on the Hall of Fame ballot, Murphy secured 18.9% of the vote, falling well short of the 75% necessary to enter the Baseball Hall of Fame on the BBWAA ballot. Since Murphy's removal from the BBWAA ballot, his Hall of Fame candidacy has been considered twice by the Modern Era Baseball Committee, in 2018 and 2020, and once by the Contemporary Baseball Era Players Committee in 2022.

Post-baseball life
From 1997 to 2000, Murphy served as president of the Massachusetts Boston Mission of the LDS Church.

In 2005, Murphy started a non-profit organization called the iWontCheat Foundation to promote ethical behavior, and deter steroid use and cheating in youth athletics. Since 2008 all players from the participating teams at the Little League World Series wear the "I WON'T CHEAT!" embroidered patch above the Little League Baseball logo on the left sleeve of their jerseys.

In 2008, he was appointed to the National Advisory Board for the national children's charity, Operation Kids. Murphy serves as a national advisor to ASCEND: A Humanitarian Alliance. Murphy is a long time supporter of Operation Smile and also currently serves on the organization's Board of Governors.

During the 2012 MLB season, Murphy was a part of the Atlanta Braves TV broadcasting crew and participated in the telecast of at least 14 games.

He was the first-base coach for the USA team in the 2013 World Baseball Classic.

In 2017 he opened a restaurant, Murph's, in Atlanta near Truist Park, where the Braves have played since the 2017 season.  He lives in Alpine, Utah.

Author
Murphy has written three books. The first, The Scouting Report on Professional Athletics, elaborates details of the professional athlete's lifestyle. Murphy discusses balancing career and family, working with agents, managing business affairs, serving one's community, and preparing for retirement. In his second book, an autobiography titled Murph, he talked about his religious faith. He discussed the struggles of his early baseball career and how he overcame problems. In 2007 Murphy wrote his third book, The Scouting Report for Youth Athletics'', in response to what he saw as the increase in negative behavior in youth sports resulting from poor examples set by professional athletes. Included with each book is a 50-page insert which includes contributions from, among others, Peyton Manning, Dwyane Wade, Tom Glavine, and Danica Patrick. In a question-and-answer format, they discuss the lessons they learned from youth sports and how they apply the lessons today. There is also a physician-penned section about illegal performance-enhancing drug use in sports.

Personal life
Murphy and his wife, Nancy, have eight children: sons Chad, Travis, Shawn, Tyson, Taylor, Jake, and McKay and daughter Madison.

See also

 30–30 club
 List of Major League Baseball annual home run leaders
 List of Major League Baseball career runs scored leaders
 List of Major League Baseball career runs batted in leaders
 List of Major League Baseball annual runs batted in leaders
 List of Major League Baseball annual runs scored leaders
 List of Major League Baseball career hits leaders
 List of Major League Baseball career home run leaders
 List of Major League Baseball career stolen bases leaders
 Major League Baseball consecutive games played streaks

References

External links

Dale Murphy at SABR (Baseball BioProject)
Dale Murphy at Baseball Almanac
Dale Murphy at Baseball Gauge
Dale Murphy at Baseball Biography

1956 births
Living people
20th-century Mormon missionaries
American leaders of the Church of Jesus Christ of Latter-day Saints
American Mormon missionaries in the United States
American sportsmen
Atlanta Braves announcers
Atlanta Braves players
Baseball coaches from Oregon
Baseball players from Portland, Oregon
Brigham Young University alumni
Colorado Rockies players
Converts to Mormonism
Gold Glove Award winners
Greenwood Braves players
Kingsport Braves players
Latter Day Saints from Georgia (U.S. state)
Latter Day Saints from Oregon
Major League Baseball center fielders
Major League Baseball players with retired numbers
Mission presidents (LDS Church)
National League All-Stars
National League home run champions
National League Most Valuable Player Award winners
National League RBI champions
People from Alpine, Utah
Philadelphia Phillies players
Richmond Braves players
Savannah Braves players
Silver Slugger Award winners
United States national baseball team people
Ida B. Wells-Barnett High School alumni